Stefan Dannö (born 10 February 1969) is an international former Speedway rider who rode in the Speedway World Championship. He also rode for the Eastbourne Eagles in the British Speedway League and Indianerna in the  Swedish Elite League when they were champions in 1990 and 1991. He was Swedish Champion in 2003. His brother Roland Dannö was also a speedway rider.

Speedway Grand Prix results

World Longtrack Championship

One Day Finals
 1991  Marianske Lazne (6th) 12pts
 1992  Pfarrkirchen (10th) 9pts
 1993  Muhldorf (10th) 9pts
 1995  Scheessel (16th) 3pts

World Team Cup

World final
 1996 -  Hofheim, Hesse (with Daniel Andersson / Niklas Klingberg) - 5th - 14pts

See also 
 Sweden national speedway team
 List of Speedway Grand Prix riders
 List of Speedway Long Track World Championship riders

References 

1969 births
Living people
Swedish speedway riders
Individual Speedway Long Track World Championship riders
Eastbourne Eagles riders
People from Östersund
Sportspeople from Jämtland County